Jetton is an English surname. Notable people with the surname include:

 Lew Jetton (born 1959), American guitarist and singer
 Paul Jetton (1964–2016), American football player
 Rod Jetton (born 1967), American politician, author, and businessman

English-language surnames